Burgess is an unincorporated community in Northumberland County, in the U.S. state of Virginia. The ZIP Code is 22432.

Versailles was listed on the National Register of Historic Places in 1997.

References

Unincorporated communities in Northumberland County, Virginia
Unincorporated communities in Virginia